The Fiat 525 is a passenger car produced by Italian automobile manufacturer Fiat between 1928 and 1931. The 525 was a larger successor to the Fiat 512. The 525 was modified a year after it began production and renamed the 525N. A sport variant, the 525SS, had a more powerful engine and a shorter chassis.

Fiat produced 4,400 525's.

Engines

References
Fiat Personenwagen, by Fred Steiningen, 1994. 

525
Cars introduced in 1928
1930s cars